The Dr. Mangal Sain Museum (earlier, Haryana Rural Antique Museum) in Hisar, Haryana, India is located inside the Gandhi Bhawan building of Chaudhary Charan Singh Haryana Agricultural University.

History
The museum construction started in 1975  and was completed around 1978, to preserve the vanishing antiques of rural Haryana. The museum was extended with additional space in 2010.

Reconstruction
The reconstruction of the museum started in 2018 and was projected to finish by 2019 but completed in 2021. The museum now have a scale model of central complex of CCS HAU, a Mixed reality studio, different soil samples from Haryana, digital platform showcasing pioneering projects of HAU, traditional and folklores of Haryana, a library, and a lot more.

The museum was inaugurated and opened for public by Governor of Haryana & Chancellor of CCS HAU Hon. Sh. Bandaru Dattatreya along with Chief Minister Sh. Manohar Lal Khattar in March 2022.

Departments and collections
The museum houses the collection of antiquities showcasing development of agriculture and rural society in Haryana. The collection includes dresses, agricultural and farm tools and implements, rural tools and equipment, rural music instruments, Haryanvi folk dresses for men and women, farm vehicles, etc.

Exhibition hall
The Gandhi Bhawan building, that houses the extension education department of the university, also has exhibition hall for hosting exhibitions.

Gallery

See also

 Pranpir Badshah tomb, Panchyat Bhawan in Hisar Govt College ground
 Jahaj Kothi Museum at Hisar fort
 Rakhigarhi Indus Valley Civilisation Museum near Hisar
 Asigarh Fort
 Sheikhpura Kothi near Hansi
 Dharohar Museum at Kurukshetra University
 Kurukshetra Panorama and Science Centre at Kurukshetra
 Shrikrishna Museum at Kurukshetra
 Rewari Railway Heritage Museum at Rewari railway station

References

Museums in Haryana
Tourist attractions in Hisar district
Buildings and structures in Hisar (city)